This is a list of double bassists known for their slap bass technique.

Didi Beck
Bill Black
Wellman Braud
Steve Brown (bass player)
Dorsey Burnette
Ray Campi
Willie Dixon
Pops Foster
Milt Hinton
William Manuel Johnson
Geoff Kresge
Marshall Lytle
Kim Nekroman
Scott Owen
Lee Rocker
Djordje Stijepovic
Jimbo Wallace

See also
List of slap bass players (electric bass)

References

slap bass